Rapid River may refer to:

Communities
Rapid River, Michigan, Delta County
Rapid River Township, Michigan, Kalkaska County
Rapid River Township, Lake of the Woods County, Minnesota

Rivers

U.S. 
 Rapid River (Alaska-Yukon)
 Rapid River (Maine)
 Rapid River (Delta County, Michigan)
 Rapid River (Kalkaska County, Michigan)
 Rapid River (Ontonagon County, Michigan)
 Rapid River (Little Fork River tributary), Minnesota
 Rapid River (Rainy River tributary), Minnesota
 Rapid River (Washington)

Canada 
 Rapid River (Alaska-Yukon)
 Rapid River (Algoma District), Ontario
 Rapid River (Sudbury District), Ontario
 Rapid River (British Columbia)
 Rapid River (Churchill River tributary), Saskatchewan
 Rapid River (Cree River tributary), Saskatchewan
 Rapides River, Côte-Nord region of Quebec, Canada.

Other 

 Namco Rapid River, arcade game

See also

Little Rapid River (disambiguation)
 Rapid River Township (disambiguation)
 Rapid River (Michigan)